The Bhuj Formation is a Mesozoic (Tithonian to Aptian) geologic formation in India. Fossil sauropod tracks and tracks from the ichnogenera Skolithos, Diplocraterion, Pholeus and Planolites have been reported from the formation.

See also 
 List of dinosaur-bearing rock formations
 List of stratigraphic units with sauropodomorph tracks
 Sauropod tracks

References

Bibliography 
  

Geologic formations of India
Aptian Stage
Barremian Stage
Berriasian Stage
Hauterivian Stage
Tithonian Stage
Valanginian Stage
Sandstone formations
Ichnofossiliferous formations
Fossiliferous stratigraphic units of Asia
Paleontology in India
Geology of Gujarat